Leipzig is a ghost town in Grant County, North Dakota, United States. The community was abandoned in 1910 when it was bypassed by the Northern Pacific Railroad.

History
The name "Leipzig" is a Slavic word that originated circa 1015 in Germany, meaning "a settlement by the lime trees." A settlement named Leipzig was founded in Bessarabia in 1844 by request of the Emperor of Austria. In 1896, 15 German-Russian Leipziger families travelled to the United States and started a new community named after their former home. In 1910, the Northern Pacific Railroad bypassed Leipzig and instead ran 11 miles to the southwest. The Leipzigers then moved their settlement to that location in May and founded New Leipzig.

References

Geography of Grant County, North Dakota
Ghost towns in North Dakota
Populated places established in 1896
Populated places disestablished in 1910
1896 establishments in North Dakota
1910 disestablishments in the United States